Marshal of Poland is the highest rank in the Polish Army. It has been granted to only six officers. At present, Marshal is equivalent to a Field Marshal or General of the Army (OF-10) in other NATO armies.

History

Today there are no living Marshals of Poland, since this rank is bestowed only on military commanders who have achieved victory in war.  Recently, however, the rank of four-star with modernized name Generał has been introduced, and on August 15, 2002, was granted to Czesław Piątas, at present civilian, former Chief of the General Staff of the Armed Forces of Poland.

List of Marshals
In all, the following people have served as Marshals of Poland.

References

Military ranks of Poland